Dumme refers to two streams in Germany:  

 Salzwedeler Dumme, a western tributary of the Jeetzel/Jeetze in Saxony-Anhalt
 Wustrower Dumme,  a western tributary of the Jeetzel/Jeetze in Saxony-Anhalt and Lower Saxony